Martha Roth (29 May 1932 – 7 October 2016) was an Italian-born Mexican film actress. She became a star during the Golden age of Mexican cinema.

Early life 
Roth was born as Martha Roth Pizzo in Padua, Italy. When Roth was a child, her family moved to Mexico. There she studied music and received her first training in acting.

Selected filmography

Film
 A Family Like Many Others (1949)
 Ventarrón (1949)
 The Lost City (1950)
 A Gringo Girl in Mexico (1951)
 Engagement Ring (1951)
 Serenade in Acapulco (1951)
 The Black Pirates (1954)
 Massacre (1956)
 The White Renegade (1960)

Television
 2007 Destilando Amor - Doña Pilar Gil Vda. de Montalvo 
 2001 La intrusa - Norma Iturbide Vda. del Bosque
 2001 El noveno mandamiento - Eugenia D'Anjou de Betancourt
 1999 Mujeres engañadas - Doña Catalina Cortés Vda. de Duarte
 1998 Gotita de amor - Dalila
 1997 Mi pequeña traviesa - Elena 
 1990 En carne propia - Leda Dumont 
 1988 El pecado de Oyuki - Lady Elizabeth Pointer
 1985 Los años pasan, Mercedes 
 1984 Eclipse - Amalia  
 1981 Nosotras las mujeres - Mónica
 1973 Penthouse 
 1969 De turno con la angustia - Elena

References

Bibliography
  R. Hernandez-Rodriguez. Splendors of Latin Cinema. ABC-CLIO, 2009.

External links

1932 births
2016 deaths
Actors from Mexico City
Italian emigrants to Mexico
Italian film actresses
Mexican film actresses